Cozi is a website and mobile app intended to help families stay organized. Its features include allowing multiple family members to manage schedules with one account, as well as organize and update shopping and to-do lists.

The website was founded by Robbie Cape and Jan Miksovsky after the two of them left Microsoft. The company's first product, Cozi Central, was released on September 25, 2006, and included a family calendar, shopping lists, family messaging and a photo collage screensaver. The company is based in Seattle, Washington.

Cozi has both a freemium version, and a paid version called Cozi Gold. Cozi Gold's additional features include Cozi Contacts, a birthday tracker, more reminders, mobile month view, and change notifications. The software can be used on a desktop or mobile applications for iOS and Android.

Cozi was acquired by Time Inc. in 2014. After the Meredith Corporation acquired Time in 2018, Cozi was moved into the Parents Network division.

On May 4, 2022, Cozi was acquired by OurFamilyWizard of Minneapolis, Minnesota. 

On June 5, 2011, Cozi set a Guinness World Record for the longest line of ducks in a row. The line stretched for one mile and was made up of 17,782 rubber ducks.

References

External links
 
 Business 2.0 article on Cozi

Companies established in 2005
Web service providers
2014 mergers and acquisitions
Web applications
IAC (company)